The 2014 Southampton City Council election took place on Thursday 22 May 2014 to elect members of Southampton City Council in Hampshire, England. One third of the council (16 seats) was up for election, and an additional vacancy in Millbrook ward caused by the resignation of a sitting councillor who had been elected in 2012 was also filled, meaning a total of 17 of the city's 48 seats were elected. The elections took place on the same day as the elections to the European Parliament.

Southampton Council is elected in thirds, which means the all comparisons are to the corresponding 2010 Southampton City Council election. In Millbrook, the candidate with the most votes was elected for a full term lasting until 2018. The candidate who came second was elected for the remainder of the resigned councillor's term, ending in 2016.

Coxford councillors who formed the Putting People First group originally split from Labour in 2013. Keith Morrell was up for election in the ward in this election.

Election result

Changes in council composition

Bargate

Bassett

Bevois

Bitterne

Bitterne Park

Coxford

Freemantle

Harefield

Millbrook

Peartree

Portswood

Redbridge

Shirley

Sholing

Swaythling

Woolston

References

2014 English local elections
2014
2010s in Southampton